Trinidad and Tobago competed at the Summer Olympic Games for the first time at the 1948 Summer Olympics in London, England.  The Trinidad and Tobago Olympic Committee sent five athletes and four officials to represent the nation in three sports. Errol Knowles was the Chef de Mission.

Medalists

Silver
 Rodney Wilkes — Weightlifting, Men's Featherweight

Athletics

Men's 100 metres
George Lewis
Men's 200 metres
George Lewis
Men's 800 metres
Wilfred Tull
Men's 1500 metres
Wilfred Tull
Men's 5000 metres
Manny Ramjohn
Men's 10000 metres
Manny Ramjohn

A.E. Browne – Manager/Coach

Cycling

Sprint
Compton Gonsalves

Time trial
Compton Gonsalves — 1:32 (17th place)

Laurie Rogers – Manager/Coach

Weightlifting

Men's Featherweight
Rodney Wilkes — 317.5 kg (silver medal)

Lionel Seemungal – Manager/Coach

References

Nations at the 1948 Summer Olympics
1948
1948 in Trinidad and Tobago